The 1989 NCAA Division III women's basketball tournament was the eighth annual tournament hosted by the NCAA to determine the national champion of Division III women's collegiate basketball in the United States.

Elizabethtown defeated Stanislaus State in the championship game, 66–56, to claim the Blue Jays' second Division III national title.

The championship rounds were hosted by Centre College in Danville, Kentucky.

Bracket

Elite Eight

All-tournament team
 Nancy Keene, Elizabethtown
 Kirsten Dumford, Stanislaus State
 Lisa Minturn, Stanislaus State
 Amy Huestis, Clarkson
 Susan Yates, Centre

See also
 1989 NCAA Division III men's basketball tournament
 1989 NCAA Division I women's basketball tournament
 1989 NCAA Division II women's basketball tournament
 1989 NAIA women's basketball tournament

References

 
NCAA Division III women's basketball tournament
1989 in sports in Kentucky